The 1946–47 Sheffield Shield season was the 45th season of the Sheffield Shield, the domestic first-class cricket competition of Australia. Victoria won the championship following the renewal of the tournament after the suspension imposed by World War II.

Table

Statistics

Most Runs
Keith Miller 667

Most Wickets
George Tribe 33

References

Sheffield Shield
Sheffield Shield
Sheffield Shield seasons